Dawood v Minister of Home Affairs is an important case in South African law, particularly in the areas of constitutional litigation, constitutional law and immigration law. The applicants were South African citizens and their spouses, who were neither citizens nor permanent residents of South Africa. The case examined the constitutional right of spouses to cohabit and the need for Parliament, when granting government officials powers that touch on constitutional rights, to lay down proper guidelines.

The case concerned an application to the Constitutional Court for confirmation of an order of constitutional invalidity, but the government had withdrawn its opposition to the order of confirmation. This, the court held, did not put an end to the proceedings; the court still had to determine whether to confirm, vary or set aside the order. Furthermore, the court had to determine what, if any, ancillary orders to make, and the relevant government department was best placed to assist the court in this regard. The court held that, if this is not done, its ability to carry out its constitutional mandate is hampered; indeed, the constitutional scheme itself is put at risk.

Facts 
Section 25(9) of the Aliens Control Act required applicants for immigration permits to be outside of South Africa when their permits were granted, but it exempted spouses, permanent same-sex life partners, dependant children and destitute, aged or infirm family members of South African citizens and permanent residents: these people were permitted to remain in the country pending the outcome of their applications, provided they had valid temporary residence permits.

Judgment

Withdrawal of government opposition 
Justice Kate O'Regan, writing  for a unanimous Court, noted that the Minister and Director-General were respectively the political and administrative heads of the national government department responsible for the implementation of the Act, and the foremost sources of knowledge about its terms and objectives and general application. Their last-minute abandonment, both of their appeal and of their opposition to the confirmation proceedings, was "inconvenient and discourteous," O'Regan wrote.

"Much more serious" in its consequences was the absence of legal representation on behalf of the respondents at the hearing. Where the confirmation of an order of constitutional invalidity was under consideration by the court, O'Regan held, the abandonment of an appeal did not put an end to the proceedings. The court still had to decide whether to confirm or vary or set aside the order. Moreover, the Court had to determine what ancillary orders should be made, if any. The relevant government department was best placed to assist the court in crafting such ancillary orders, by informing it of the potential disruption that an order of invalidity might cause. A common or frequent issue arising in such matters was the time the department would need to replace the unconstitutional provision.

Section 8(2) of the Constitutional Court Complementary Act provides that, when an order of constitutional invalidity is referred to the Constitutional Court for confirmation, the President of the Court may request the Minister of Justice to appoint counsel to present argument to the court at the confirmation proceedings. This provision, O'Regan wrote, "enables the Court to ensure that it obtains the necessary argument in relation to such proceedings." By withdrawing from these proceedings "at such a late stage," the respondents had not only deprived the court of the benefit of being able to canvass the issues relating to confirmation fully at the proceedings, but also had made it "impossible," she wrote, for the President of the Court to ask the Minister of Justice to appoint counsel to assist the court.

In the constitutional scheme, which "recognises the separation of powers, holds high the rule of law and enjoins all organs of State to protect the Constitution," the Constitutional Court had "the special and onerous responsibility" finally to determine the constitutionality of legislation, and to declare unconstitutional legislation invalid. The court could best carry out this task if careful and detailed evidence and argument was placed before it by those in government qualified to do so, particularly when legislation was under challenge. If this is not done, "the Court's ability to perform its constitutional mandate is hampered and the constitutional scheme itself may be put at risk. It is for these reasons," O'Regan wrote, "that the late abandonment of the appeal and the absence of the respondents at the confirmation hearing were unfortunate."

Merits 
O'Regan noted that there was no automatic entitlement to such temporary permits. Each application was to be considered on its merits, and the grant or extension of a temporary-residence permit to a foreign spouse might be refused. The South African spouse would then be forced to go abroad with the foreign spouse or remain behind alone, pending the outcome of the application. Many were too poor to have this choice, and had to remain in South Africa without their spouses. Enforced separation, O'Regan found, places strain on any relationship, and may destroy the marriage relationship altogether.

Although the right to family life is not expressly mentioned in the Bill of Rights, such right is constitutionally protected. The right to family life is recognised in international treaties and receives protection in a variety of ways, while marriage and the family are of vital importance to society. Also, human dignity, entrenched in section 10 of the Bill of Rights, is of fundamental importance to South African society and constitutional interpretation, especially because of the country's past, when it was routinely and cruelly denied. Human dignity, O'Regan observed, is a foundational value which informs the interpretation of many, perhaps all, other rights.

The right to enter into and sustain permanent intimate relationships, furthermore, is part of the right to dignity. Entering into and sustaining a marriage relationship are of defining significance for many people. Not only legislation that prohibits the right to form a marriage relationship infringes the right to dignity; any legislation that significantly impairs the ability of spouses to honour their obligations to one another would also limit such a right. A central aspect of marriage, she found, is cohabitation and the right and duty to live together. She held that legislation which significantly impairs the ability to honour this obligation therefore constitutes a limitation of the right to dignity.

There may be, O'Regan conceded, constitutionally acceptable reasons for refusing the grant or extension of a temporary residence permit, but they were not identified in the Act. The legislature must identify the policy considerations that would render a refusal of a temporary residence-permit justifiable. It must take care to limit the risk of an unconstitutional exercise of the discretionary powers it confers, as it has a constitutional obligation to “respect, promote, protect and fulfil the rights in the Bill of Rights.” The omission from the Aliens Control Act of criteria relevant to a refusal to grant or extend temporary residence permits introduced an element of arbitrariness that was inconsistent with the constitutional protection of the right to marry and establish a family.

Section 25(9)(b) was therefore found to be invalid, the invalidation being suspended for two years. In the meantime officials, when dealing with applications for the granting or extension of temporary residence permits of spouses of South African citizens or permanent residents, and the other persons exempted, must take into account the constitutional rights of such people, and issue or extend temporary residence permits to them unless good cause exists to refuse: for example, where even the temporary issue or extension of a permit would constitute a real threat to the public.

See also 
 Constitutional litigation in South Africa
 South African constitutional law
 South African immigration law

References 
 Dawood and Another v Minister of Home Affairs and Others; Shalabi and Another v Minister of Home Affairs and Others; Thomas and Another v Minister of Home Affairs and Others (CCT35/99) [2000] ZACC 8; 2000 (3) SA 936; 2000 (8) BCLR 837 (7 June 2000).

Notes 

2000 in South African law
2000 in case law
South African constitutional law
Constitutional Court of South Africa cases